Tovah Khoshkeh (also Romanized as Tūvah Khoshkeh and Tūveh Khoshkeh; also known as Tūy Khoshkeh and Tovah Khoshkeh-ye Shekar) is a village in Kunani Rural District, Kunani District, Kuhdasht County, Lorestan Province, Iran. At the 2006 census, its population was 1,153, in 222 families.

References 

Towns and villages in Kuhdasht County